Engel Reinhoudt (26 January 1946 – 11 July 2020) was a Dutch musician and dialect writer. His nickname was 'de Zeêuwse Bard'.

Reinhoudt was born in Wolphaartsdijk and later lived in ’s-Heerenhoek. Reinhoudt was best known for composing and singing songs in Zeelandic; a Dutch dialect spoken in the province Zeeland. His best known song is “ Een bolus bie de koffie” (Coffee with a bolus). He also wrote in a sub-Zeelandic dialect . Reinhoudt did furthermore many more things to keep the dialect of Zeeland alive. Reinhoudt published stories and poems and translated children's books. Among others he translated books of Miffy and Disney's Pete. He wrote a weekly column for the regional newspaper PZC. He also had side projects involving the revitalization of local churches, such as the one in Ellewoudtsdijk that he helped become commonly known by the people in the country.

For his works, Reinhoudt was awarded in 2019 the “Goessche Diep Fondsprijs”; a prize awarded annually by the Zeeland department of the Prins Bernhard Cultuurfonds.

After being ill for a while, Reinhoudt died on 11 July 2020 at the age of 74.

References

External links
official website

Dutch singers
Dutch translators
Dutch writers
People from Goes
Place of death missing
1946 births
2020 deaths